Meriania almedae is a species of plant in the family Melastomataceae. It is endemic to Ecuador.  Its natural habitat is subtropical or tropical moist montane forests. It is listed as vulnerable with the main threat being habitat destruction.

References

Endemic flora of Ecuador
almedae
Vulnerable plants
Taxonomy articles created by Polbot